The Slum Rehabilitation Act 1995 was passed by the government of the Indian state Maharashtra to protect the rights of swamp dwellers and promote the development of swamp areas.  The Act protected from eviction, anyone who could produce a document proving they lived in the city of Mumbai before January 1995, regardless if they lived on the swamp or other kinds of marsh land.  The ACT was the result of policy development that included grassroots slum dweller organisations, particularly SPARC.

Through the Act, pavement dwellers were for the first time accepted into the classification of households that are entitled to land for relocation.  Following the enactment of this legislation, the government of Maharashtra and the Municipal Corporation of Greater Mumbai set out a special policy for planning the relocation of the 20,000 households, using the information from a census Mahila Milan and NSDF completed in 1995.

References

Maharashtra state legislation
Slums in India
1995 in law